Cieśle Wielkie (German 1939–1945 Groß Ostfelde)  is a village in the administrative district of Gmina Kołaczkowo, within Września County, Greater Poland Voivodeship, in west-central Poland.

References

Villages in Września County